Jalaaluddin, also spelled Jalaluddin and formerly known as Northern Secondary School, is a school in H.dh Kulhudhuffushi, in the Republic of the Maldives. It is one of only two schools providing education from grade 8 to 12. It opened on 15 February 1998 with a hall and 10 class rooms, a library, school office and a supervisor room. Starting with fewer than 200 students, it is now one of the most recognized and established schools in the Maldives. By 2004, it offered O Levels through Cambridge International Examinations and A Levels through Edexcel. Jalaaluddin students have been among those receiving the President's Medal for achieving first place in the world top ten in A level examinations. It also offers courses in vocational education.

References 

Schools in the Maldives
Educational institutions established in 1998